The International Journal of Eating Disorders is a peer-reviewed medical journal covering the study of eating disorders. It was established in 1981 and is published eight times per year by John Wiley & Sons. The editor-in-chief is Ruth Striegel Weissman (Wesleyan University). According to the Journal Citation Reports, the journal has a 2020 impact factor of 4.861, ranking it 27th out of 89 journals in the category "Nutrition & Dietetics".

References

External links

Eating disorders
Psychiatry journals
Clinical psychology journals
Wiley (publisher) academic journals
Publications established in 1981
English-language journals
Nutrition and dietetics journals
8 times per year journals